Leila’s Brothers (Persian: برادران لیلا, romanized: Barâdarâne Leylâ) is a 2022 Iranian drama film directed, written and co-produced by Saeed Roustayi, starring Taraneh Alidoosti, Navid Mohammadzadeh, Saeed Poursamimi and Payman Maadi. In April 2022, the film was selected to compete for the Palme d'Or at the 2022 Cannes Film Festival.

Synopsis 
At 40 years old, Leila (Taraneh Alidoosti) has spent her whole life taking care of her parents and her four brothers. The family argues constantly and is crushed by debts, in a country caught in the grip of international economic sanctions. As her brothers are trying to make ends meet, Leila formulates a plan: to start a family business that would save them for poverty.

Cast 
 Taraneh Alidoosti as Leila Jourablou
 Navid Mohammadzadeh as Alireza Jourablou
 Saeed Poursamimi as Esmail Jourablou
 Payman Maadi as Manouchehr Jourablou
 Mohammad Alimohammadi as Farhad Jourablou
 Nayereh Farahani as The mother 
 Mehdi Hosseininia as Bayram
 Farhad Aslani as Parviz Jourablou

Release 
The film was selected to compete for the Palme d'Or at the 2022 Cannes Film Festival which was held from 17 to 28 May 2022.

Reception

Critical response
On review aggregator website Rotten Tomatoes, 90% of 10 reviews are positive for the film, with an average rating of 6/10. Metacritic assigned the film a weighted average score of 87 out of 100, based on 5 reviews, indicating "universal acclaim".

Accolades

Controversy

Actors sexual assaults charges
The two actors in this film, Saeed Poursamimi and Farhad Aslani, were accused of sexually assaulting Katayoun Riahi and Somayyeh Mirshamsi. Both charges were after filming.

While Taraneh Alidoosti, another actress in this film, is one of the women following the complaints of abused women in the cinema.

After Aslani was charged by the assistant director Somayyeh Mirshamsi, Alidoosti announced on her Instagram that the rest of the cast won't stand by the accused at the 2022 Cannes Film Festival. At the festival, Aslani did not go to Cannes.

After the cast appeared on the red carpet, the famous actress, Katayoun Riahi, posted the photo of Poursamimi at Cannes with a red cross on him and mentioning the Iranian page of me too movement in her Instagram story.

The next day, she posted on Instagram that she had been sexually assaulted by him 25 years ago.

In June 1, a retired actress, Ladan Tabatabaei, announced in a live stream on Instagram that she had also been verbally abused by Poursamimi.

Iranian government's response
The Cinema Organization of Iran's Ministry of Culture and Islamic Guidance expressed dissatisfaction with the film as cast members made remarks critical of the Iranian government at Cannes, and Mohammadzadeh kissed his wife, Fereshteh Hosseini, on the red carpet. On 1 June 2022, minister Mohammad Mehdi Esmaili said the film may not be allowed to be released in Iran since it screened at Cannes without the government's approval, which he said was against the law. On 22 June 2022, Esmaili said the organization had officially banned the film.

References

External links 
 

Films directed by Saeed Roustayi
Iranian drama films
2020s Persian-language films
2022 drama films
2022 films